Robert F. Kortman (December 24, 1887 – March 13, 1967) was an American film actor mostly associated with westerns, though he also appeared in a number of Laurel and Hardy comedies. He appeared in more than 260 films between 1914 and 1952.

Biography
The son of a rancher, Kortman was born in Brackettville, Texas, in 1887. He spent six years in the U.S. cavalry. 

Director Tom Ince cast Kortman as a villain when he began working in films in 1911, and he went on to become the "favored on-screen opponent" for William S. Hart with regard to their film fights.

After he left acting, Kortman was president of a cooperative water company in Arrowhead Springs, California, where he lived.

Kortman was married to Gonda Durand, a Mack Sennett bathing beauty. He died in Long Beach, California from cancer.

Selected filmography

 The Narrow Trail (1917)
 Through the Wrong Door (1919)
 The Great Radium Mystery (1919)
 Godless Men (1920)
 Winners of the West (1921)
 Travelin' On (1922)
 The Lone Hand (1922)
 Another Man's Boots (1922)
 The Shock (1923)
 All the Brothers Were Valiant (1923)
 His Last Race (1923)
 The White Sheep (1924)
 The Temptress (1926)
 The Eagle of the Sea (1926)
 Unseen Enemies (1926)
 The Devil Horse (1926)
 Duck Soup (1927)
 Hills of Peril (1927)
 The Noose (1928)
 Four Sons (1928)
 Fleetwing (1928)
 The Black Watch (1929)
 Devil-May-Care (1929)
 Bear Shooters (1930)
 The Lone Defender (1930)
 Women Everywhere (1930)
 Trader Horn (1931) (scenes deleted)
 The Vanishing Legion (1931)
 The Lightning Warrior (1931)
 Pardon Us (1931)
 The Last Parade (1931)
 Beau Hunks (1931)
 The Fighting Fool (1932)
 The Last of the Mohicans (1932)
 Come On, Tarzan (1932)
 The Pride of the Legion (1932)
 The Whispering Shadow (1933)
 Before Midnight (1933)
 The Midnight Patrol (1933)
 The Fugitive (1933)
 Rainbow Ranch (1933)
 Mystery Mountain (1934)
 The Miracle Rider (1935)
 Lawless Range (1935)
 Wild Mustang (1935)
 The Lonely Trail (1936)
 Winds of the Wasteland (1936)
 The Vigilantes Are Coming (1936)
 Robinson Crusoe of Clipper Island (1936)
 Romance Rides the Range (1936)
 Wild West Days  (1937)
 Luck of Roaring Camp (1937)
 Anything for a Thrill (1937)
 Sandflow (1937)
 Texas Trail (1937)
 The Oklahoma Kid (1939) as Juryman (uncredited)
 Adventures of Red Ryder (1940)
 Lady from Louisiana (1941)
 The Lone Rider Rides On (1941)
 Fugitive Valley (1941)
 Thundering Hoofs (1942)
 Days of Old Cheyenne (1943)
 Black Hills Express (1943)
 Lucky Cowboy (1944)
 Stagecoach Outlaws (1945)

References

External links

1887 births
1967 deaths
American male film actors
American male silent film actors
Male actors from Texas
Deaths from cancer in California
Male Western (genre) film actors
20th-century American male actors